Wellington Frank Stewart, also known as W. Frank Stewart (dates and places of birth and death missing), was a silver mining operator in Storey County in western Nevada, who served as a Democrat in the Nevada State Senate from 1876 to 1880. In 1969, the actor Dick Simmons was cast as Stewart in the episode "How to Beat a Badman" of the syndicated television series Death Valley Days.

References

Democratic Party Nevada state senators
American miners
People from Virginia City, Nevada
Year of birth missing
Year of death missing